A- or a- may refer to:
A-hyphen
 A- (plane), a U.S. military aircraft prefix
 Privative a, a prefix expressing negation
 Copulative a, a prefix expressing unification

A-minus
 A−, a blood type in the ABO blood group system
 A− (grade), an educational grade in the letter-grading system, above B+ but below A

See also
 Ā